Jim Krieg (born May 29, 1949) is a former American football wide receiver who played one season in the National Football League for the Denver Broncos.  He played college football at the University of Washington and was drafted in the fifth round of the 1972 NFL Draft.

College
Krieg was a two-year letterman at wide receiver while at Washington from 1970 to 1971.  In 1970, his 54 receptions for 738 yards were the most in program history to date.  Known as a tremendous special teams player, as of 2012, still he holds Washington's kickoff returns records for career touchdowns (3), season touchdowns (2), and career average (27.7 yds/return).

Following his Washington career, Krieg played in the December 1971 East–West Shrine Game and 1972 Hula Bowl.

See also
 Washington Huskies football statistical leaders

References

1949 births
Living people
American football wide receivers
Washington Huskies football players
Denver Broncos players
Players of American football from Buffalo, New York
Portland Storm players
Portland Thunder (WFL) players